The New Jewish Cemetery in Žižkov, Prague, Czech Republic, was established in 1890 to relieve the space problem at the Old Jewish cemetery in Žižkov, where the Žižkov Television Tower now stands. It is about 10 times bigger than the Old Jewish Cemetery in Josefov and provides space for approximately 100,000 graves, therefore having the capacity to serve for a whole century. There is also a specially designated area for urns, though the Jewish tradition does not allow cremation. The cemetery is still in use today and operated by the Jewish Community in Prague.

The cemetery is noted for its many art nouveau monuments, among them, two monuments for members of the Perutz family by Jan Kotěra, the monument to artist Max Horb by Jan Štursa in the form of a mourning peacock, and many remarkable works of the decorative and sculptural arts in florid art nouveau style by less well-known artists.
One of the more elaborate tombs belongs to the Waldes family; the tomb is decorated with two busts, the last pieces of art made by the important Czech sculptor Josef Václav Myslbek, creator of the Wenceslas Square famous statue of St. Wenceslas.

Notable burials
 Franz Kafka
 Arne Laurin
 Arnošt Lustig
 Jiří Orten
 Ota Pavel
 Vilem Flusser

References

External links

 Information at the Jewish Community of Prague website
 Prague New Jewish Cemetery web page

1891 establishments in Austria-Hungary
19th-century establishments in Bohemia
Art Nouveau architecture in Prague
Art Nouveau cemeteries
Cemeteries in Prague
Jewish cemeteries in the Czech Republic
Jews and Judaism in Prague
Tourist attractions in Prague
Žižkov
19th-century architecture in the Czech Republic